Clean Bandit are an English electronic music group, formed in Cambridge in 2008. They have had four number 1 hits and ten top 10 hits on the UK Singles Chart. They direct and produce their own music videos, many of which have been nominated for Brit Awards and VMAs, while two of them, "Symphony" and "Rockabye", each have over 1 billion views on YouTube, with Rockabye having reached over 2.7 billion views. The group currently consists of founder Grace Chatto and brothers Jack and Luke Patterson. Jack Patterson is the principal songwriter and has been awarded two Ivor Novellos for the writing of "Rather Be". Many of their projects are known for blending elements of both classical and dance music, and featuring guest vocalists. Notable collaborators include Marina, Demi Lovato, Jess Glynne, Anne-Marie, Sean Paul, Zara Larsson, Julia Michaels, Luis Fonsi, Ellie Goulding, Iann Dior, Mabel, and Lizzo.

The band released their debut single "A+E" in 2012, followed by their 2013 single "Mozart's House", the latter of which reached number 17 on the UK Singles Chart. In January 2014, they scored their first UK chart topping single with "Rather Be", a collaboration with Jess Glynne. The song also reached number 10 on the US Billboard Hot 100. In 2015, the song won the Grammy Award for Best Dance Recording. The band's debut album New Eyes was released in June 2014 and has received a gold certification from the BPI. Their 2016 single "Rockabye", which features Jamaican artist Sean Paul and singer Anne-Marie, became their second number one hit in the UK and the Christmas number one single for 2016. The song became an international chart topper for the band, additionally charting at number nine in the US. "Symphony" featuring Zara Larsson became their third UK number one single in 2017. Their second album, What Is Love?, was released in November 2018. , Clean Bandit have sold over 13 million singles and 1.6 million albums worldwide.

History

2008–2012: Formation and career beginnings
Original band members Grace Chatto, Jack Patterson, Luke Patterson and Neil Amin-Smith met while studying as undergraduates at Jesus College, University of Cambridge. At the time, Amin-Smith, who attended Westminster School was leading a string quartet together with Chatto, who attended The Latymer School. The original vocalist, Ssegawa-Ssekintu Kiwanuka, left to undertake a PhD in laser analytics. In 2011, Chatto and Jack Patterson formed their own film production company, Cleanfilm, to make music videos for themselves and other artists.

The band's name, Clean Bandit, comes from a translation of a Russian phrase; the meaning is similar to the English phrase "complete bastard", though Patterson later stated that it is actually a more affectionate term similar to "utter rascal".

2012–2015: New Eyes

In December 2012, Clean Bandit released their debut single "A+E", which peaked at number 100 on the UK Singles Chart. In March 2013, they released their second single "Mozart's House". The song peaked at number 17 on the UK Singles Chart. Their third single "Dust Clears" charted at number 43 in the UK. The band's fourth single "Rather Be" featuring Jess Glynne was released on in January 2014 and topped the UK Singles Chart. It was the fastest-selling song released in January since 1996 and ended 2014 as the year's second best-selling song in the UK (behind "Happy" by Pharrell Williams), selling over 1.13 million copies. "Rather Be" also reached number one in Austria, Finland, Germany, Netherlands, Norway and Sweden, whilst charting at number ten on the US Billboard Hot 100. In April 2014, the band made their TV debut on BBC's Later... with Jools Holland. The following month, they announced a 14-date headline tour of the UK. The band's debut studio album New Eyes, was released in June 2014 by Atlantic Records UK. In September 2014, they performed with the BBC Philharmonic Orchestra at MediaCityUK. In November, the band collaborated again with Jess Glynne, on their single "Real Love". It reached number two on the UK Singles Chart. The same month, the band performed as part of the charity group Band Aid 30 alongside other British and Irish pop acts, recording the latest version of the track "Do They Know It's Christmas?" to raise money for the 2014 Ebola crisis in West Africa.

In February 2015, "Rather Be" won the Grammy Award for Best Dance Recording at the 57th Annual Grammy Awards. The group recorded a 30-piece orchestral version of "Rather Be" at Abbey Road Studios for Marks & Spencer's Christmas 2015 advertising campaign.

2016–2019: What Is Love? and Neil Amin-Smith's departure
In May 2016, the band released the single "Tears" featuring The X Factor 2015 winner Louisa Johnson, which later appeared in their second studio album. The song peaked at number five in the UK, following a performance on Britain's Got Talent.

In October 2016, it was announced that violinist and pianist Neil Amin-Smith had decided to leave Clean Bandit. Two days later, the group released their first song as a three-piece without Amin-Smith: "Rockabye", which features rapper Sean Paul and singer Anne-Marie. "Rockabye" became their second number one hit in the UK, and remained at the top spot for nine weeks. It went on to become the Christmas number one single for 2016. The song also reached number one in Ireland, Australia, New Zealand, Germany, Italy, Sweden and Switzerland. It additionally charted at number nine on the US Billboard Hot 100. In March 2017, the trio released "Symphony", a collaboration with Swedish singer Zara Larsson. The song topped the UK Singles Chart, becoming the group's third number one single in the country. They gave their first live performance of the song on The Voice UK. "Rockabye" was recorded at The Crypt Studio in London. In June, the band released the studio version of "Disconnect" with Marina Diamandis. The track was previously performed at the 2015 Coachella Festival.

In October 2017, the band announced the single "I Miss You", featuring renowned songwriter Julia Michaels. It charted within the top five of the UK and has been certified platinum. In May 2018, the band released the second album's fifth single, "Solo", featuring vocals from Demi Lovato. It topped the charts in the UK the following month and has received a platinum certification in the country. In November 2018, sixth single "Baby" was released, featuring Marina and Luis Fonsi. Clean Bandit released their second album What Is Love? in November 2018. The album features collaborations with Rita Ora, Ellie Goulding, Craig David, Anne-Marie, and Charli XCX.

2020–present: Forthcoming third studio album and new projects
Against the backdrop of the COVID-19 pandemic, the band produced a 'House Party' event fortnightly in place of the live shows which they would've performed if the pandemic hadn't happened. Clean Bandit produced six of these house parties in total, from April to July, many featuring vocals from their singer Yasmin Green. 

In early August 2020, as their live home music performances gained credit, the band agreed with Global Citizen to host a 12-hour long 'Houseparty Against Hunger' on 8 August, to raise money for the charity to help fight poverty-related hunger. The event consisted of one hour-long sets from DJs around the world.  Clean Bandit hosted the event and played at the start and end of proceedings, with their set-up the same as that used in their original house parties. Kirsten Joy, one of the band's singers, performed along with Becky Hill, Joel Corry, MNEK and a guest appearance from Sean Paul.

On 17 August, Clean Bandit announced they would be releasing a new single, titled "Tick Tock" with singer Mabel and rapper 24kGoldn. It was released on 21 August 2020.

On 26 January 2021, Clean Bandit announced their new single "Higher" featuring American rapper Iann Dior. The song was released on 29 January 2021.

On 30 July 2021, Clean Bandit released their new single "Drive" with German DJ Topic featuring Wes Nelson.

On 24 September 2021, Clean Bandit released a remix of the famous 80s hit song How Will I Know in collaboration with Whitney Houston.

On 18 February 2022, Clean Bandit released a new dance/electronic song featuring A7S called "Everything but You".

On 9 September 2022, Clean Bandit released a new single "Sad Girls" with rapper French the Kid featuring Rema.

On 21 September, Clean Bandit released another single, "Don't Leave Me Lonely" in collaboration with the songwriter Elley Duhé.

Musical style
Clean Bandit are an electronic,  electropop and dance-pop band. The band mixes electronic music with classical pieces by composers such as Mozart and Shostakovich.

Political views
In May 2017, Clean Bandit endorsed the Labour Party and Jeremy Corbyn in the 2017 UK general election. In June, the band supported a Labour Party rally in Birmingham.

In June 2018, they headlined the Labour Live festival in London.

In November 2019, they endorsed the Labour Party in the 2019 UK general election. In December 2019, along with 42 other leading cultural figures, they signed a letter stating that "Labour's election manifesto under Jeremy Corbyn's leadership offers a transformative plan that prioritises the needs of people and the planet over private profit and the vested interests of a few.  "

They endorsed Rebecca Long-Bailey in the 2020 Labour Party leadership election.

Members

Current members
 Grace Chatto – cello, keyboards, percussion, vocals 
 Jack Patterson – keyboards, vocals, piano, bass, guitar, violin, producer, DJ, saxophone 
 Luke Patterson – drums, percussion 

Current touring musicians
 Stephanie Benedetti – violin 
 Yasmin Green – vocals 
 Kirsten Joy – vocals 
 Sam Skirrow – bass 
 Dan Paisley – guitar 

Former members
 Neil Amin-Smith – violin, piano 
 Ssegawa-Ssekintu Kiwanuka – vocals 
Former touring musicians
 Patrick Greenberg – bass 
 Simon Marlin – guitar 
 Braimah Kanneh-Mason – violin 
 Nikki Cislyn – vocals 
 Florence Rawlings – vocals 
 Elisabeth Troy – vocals 
 Christina Hizon - vocals, piano 
 Ezinma – violin 
 David Gane – drums, percussion 
 Tom Varrall – guitar 
 Molly Fletcher – violin

Discography

 New Eyes (2014)
 What Is Love? (2018)

Awards and nominations

References

External links
 
 Cleanfilm.co 

21st-century classical musicians
21st-century English musicians
2008 establishments in England
Alumni of Jesus College, Cambridge
Atlantic Records artists
Black Butter Records artists
Grammy Award winners for dance and electronic music
English electronic music groups
English pop music groups
Musical groups established in 2008
Musical groups from Cambridge
Labour Party (UK) people